The 2021–22 Norfolk State Spartans men's basketball team represented Norfolk State University in the 2021–22 NCAA Division I men's basketball season. The Spartans, led by ninth-year head coach Robert Jones, played their home games at the Joseph G. Echols Memorial Hall in Norfolk, Virginia as members of the Mid-Eastern Athletic Conference. They finished the season 24–7, 12–2 in MEAC Play to finish as regular season champions. They defeated Delaware State, Morgan State, and Coppin State to win the MEAC tournament championship. As a result, they received the conference’s automatic bid to the NCAA tournament as the No. 16 seed in the East Region where they lost in the first round to Baylor.

Previous season
In  a season limited due to the ongoing COVID-19 pandemic, the Spartans finished the 2020–21 season 17–8, 8–4 in MEAC play to finish in a tie for first place in the Northern Division. They defeated North Carolina Central in the quarterfinals of the MEAC tournament, advancing directly to the championship game after their semifinal opponent, North Carolina A&T, had to withdraw due to COVID-19 protocols. They defeated Morgan State in the championship game. As a result, the received the conference's automatic bid to the NCAA tournament, the school's second ever tournament appearance and their first since 2012. They received a No. 16 seed in the West Region where they defeated Appalachian State in the First Four before losing to overall No. 1 seed Gonzaga in the first round.

Roster

Schedule and results

|-
!colspan=12 style=| Non-conference regular season

|-
!colspan=12 style=| MEAC regular season

|-
!colspan=9 style=| MEAC tournament

|-
!colspan=9 style=| NCAA tournament

Sources

References

Norfolk State Spartans men's basketball seasons
Norfolk State Spartans
Norfolk State Spartans men's basketball
Norfolk State Spartans men's basketball
Norfolk State